Kent 3 was an English Rugby Union league that was the third tier for clubs in south-east London and Kent. Promoted teams went up to Kent 2 and relegation was to Kent 4 until that league was abolished at the end of the 2000–01 season.  Dwindling numbers of teams meant that the division folded at the end of the 2007–08 season, with all sides automatically promoted to Kent 2.

Original teams

When league rugby began in 1987 this division contained the following teams:

Bexley
Cranbrook
Deal Wanderers
Linton
New Ash Green
Old Gravesendians
Sheppey
Sittingbourne
Vigo

Kent 3 honours

Number of league titles

Midland Bank (2)
Bexley (1)
Brockleians (1)
Cranbrook (1)
Deal & Betteshanger (1)
Erith (1)
Lordswood (1)
Medway (1)
Met Police Hayes (1)
New Ash Green (1)
Old Gravesendians (1)
Old Williamsonians (1)
Orpington (1)
Sheppey (1)
Shooters Hill (1)
Thames Polytechnic (1)
Tonbridge (1)
Vigo (1)

Notes

See also
London & SE Division RFU
Kent RFU
English rugby union system
Rugby union in England

References

Defunct rugby union leagues in England
Rugby union in Kent
2008 disestablishments in the United Kingdom
Sports leagues disestablished in 2008